Varge Mondar is a small village located in Sintra, Portugal, which is well known for its unique architecture. The village is located between two train stations, Oeiras and Rio de Mouro.

The Village
The village has evolved into a community of single-family and luxury homes. Many of the small three-level buildings in the village were originally designed and built by Tabaqueria, the largest tobacco company in Portugal, for their employees. Many of these houses belong to PI Workers and non-Portuguese employees of Philip Morris International, of which Tabaqueria is an affiliate.

The rest of the village is divided into three zones. The "Old Buildings" zone is located closest to the main commercial zone and public transportation, and the area is home to many affluent individuals. The zone of "Individual Homes" include mostly isolated, mid-range buildings, but also some luxury homes. The "New Buildings" zone include many lower-end structures with poor maintenance, and these buildings are home to more low-income workers.

The village has a single grammar school for children ages 6–10. Varge Mondar also boasts five coffee bars, two grocery stores, a dental clinic, a tax office and a Bank Totta branch. There is also a Community Group, although there have not been any members since early Philip Morris employees.

Because the town's population is composed entirely of Philip Morris employees and contractors, the only public transport is a singular bus system. Due to the village's low population, there are few public attractions or places for social gathering, save for a single park which, aside from exceptional construction, is relatively uninhabited and unkempt. Because it is necessary to travel in the village using cars or other vehicles, there is a surprisingly low population of homeless people.

Currently
The village is believed to be on its way to extinction, as it simply does not have the manpower or the need to be well-kept. Further, due to the lack of new businesses, schools or creation of local job opportunities other than Philip Morris Tabaqueria workers, the village does not provide much room for growth or expansion.

References

Places in Sintra
Villages in Portugal